A431 may refer to:

 A431 road (England), a road between Bath and Bristol
 A431 cells, an experimental cell line used in biomedical research